An anniversary is a day that commemorates and/or celebrates an event that occurred on the same day of the year, of the initial event.

Anniversary may also refer to:

Music
 Anniversary!, a 1989 Stan Getz album
 Anniversary (Akina Nakamori album), 1984
 Anniversary (Split Enz album), 1994
 Anniversary (Ed Roland album), unreleased album recorded in 2014
 Anniversary (Bryson Tiller album), 2020
 "Anniversary" (Tony! Toni! Toné! song), 1993
 "Anniversary" (E-girls song), 2015
 Anniversary, a compilation album by Pentangle, 1992

Other uses 
 "Anniversary" (short story), a 1959 short story by Isaac Asimov
 Anniversary (1963 film), a 1963 Canadian documentary film 
 Anniversary (2015 film), a 2015 Hong Kong film
 Anniversary Peak, a mountain in Canada
 Tomb Raider: Anniversary, a 2007 remake of the original 1996 Tomb Raider game
 The Anniversary edition of Gregg shorthand
 "Anniversary" (Space Ghost Coast to Coast), a television episode

See also 
The Anniversary (disambiguation)